The 2021 Cornwall Council election took place on 6 May 2021 as part of the 2021 United Kingdom local elections. It was contested under new division boundaries as the number of seats on the council falls from 123 to 87.

The election was won by the Conservative Party, who took an overall majority of seats.

Background 
Cornwall Council is a unitary authority which has held elections every four years since its creation in 2009. In the previous election in 2017, the Conservative Party won the most seats but short of a majority. The Liberal Democrats continued to govern the council in coalition with independent councillors.

Following a review by the Local Government Boundary Commission for England, the number of councillors to be elected has been reduced for this election from 123 in previous elections to 87.

Adam Paynter, the leader of the Liberal Democrats on the council, was suspended from the party in March 2021 after a fellow councillor complained that he had shared an email she had sent him without her permission. Paynter will stand as an independent in the 2021 elections. He stayed on as deputy leader of the council, leading the Conservative group to call a motion of no confidence in Julian German, the leader of the council. The motion was unsuccessful, with Mebyon Kernow leader Dick Cole supporting German and calling the vote to remove him "politically motivated".

In March 2021, Stephen Bush wrote that the Conservatives could gain control of the council by taking seats from independent councillors and Liberal Democrat councillors.

Council composition

Campaign 
Due to the reduction in the number of electoral divisions, seventeen divisions each had two sitting councillors competing for election.

Linda Taylor, the leader of the Conservative group, said she expected to regain control of the council and that a Conservative council could work more effectively with the county's Conservative MPs. The party's manifesto for Cornwall included pledges to move more spending to local firms, to improve recycling and to reduce speed limits in built-up areas.

The former Liberal Democrat Members of Parliament (MPs) Andrew George and Dan Rogerson stood as candidates. The Liberal Democrat manifesto was themed around the slogan "Cornwall comes first". It said the party would protect adult social care budgets, build homes for local residents and make the county carbon neutral by 2030.

The Labour Party said they expected to make gains in the election given their performance in recent general elections. They promised to improve the provision of council housing and social housing and to revitalise town centres by repurposing empty buildings.

All four incumbent Mebyon Kernow councillors stood for re-election, including the party's leader Dick Cole and deputy leader Loveday Jenkin, as part of a slate of nineteen candidates across Cornwall. The party published a list of thirty pledges including to "seek an end to the inequitable council tax and its replacement with a fairer form of local taxation which impacts less on the less well-off".

The Green Party, standing more candidates in Cornwall than they had in any previous election, proposed a tourist tax in the form of a "levy paid by accommodation providers" and said they wanted to change planning policy. Bettina Harries, the Reform UK candidate for Wadebridge East and St Minver, was also standing for election in the concurrent Buckinghamshire Council election. She said she was "totally relaxed that no-one will vote for [her] in either ward".

Council results

Electoral division results 
Statements of persons nominated were published by Cornwall Council on 9 April. Sitting councillors seeking re-election are marked with an asterisk (*). Because of boundary changes and the reduction in the number of seats, some divisions have more than one incumbent councillor standing for re-election.

Aftermath 
The Conservatives won an overall majority of seats. The election was the first with an overall majority since the council was created in 2009.

By-elections

Long Rock, Marazion & St Erth

References

2021
Cornwall Council election
2020s in Cornwall